Moosbach is a municipality in the district of Neustadt an der Waldnaab in Bavaria, Germany.

References

Neustadt an der Waldnaab (district)